Sun Menahem (or Menachem, ; born 7 September 1993) is an Israeli professional footballer who plays as a defender for Maccabi Haifa and the Israel national team.

Early life
Menahem was born in Tel Aviv, Israel, to a Jewish family.

Club career
He made his professional Israeli Premier League debut for Hapoel Nir Ramat HaSharon on 11 May 2013 in a game against Bnei Yehuda.

On 21 June 2015 Menhem signed a four-year deal with Maccabi Haifa. On 8 October 2018 he extended his contract with the club for three more years.

International career
He received his first call-up to the Israel national football team in October 2019 for Euro 2020 qualifiers against Austria and Latvia. He made his debut on 15 October 2019 in a game against Latvia. He substituted Taleb Tawatha in the 79th minute as Israel won 3–1.

Honours

Club 
Maccabi Haifa
 Israeli Premier League: 2020–21, 2021–22
 Israel State Cup: 2015–16
 Toto Cup: 2021–22
 Israel Super Cup: 2021

References

External links
 

1993 births
Living people
Israeli footballers
Israeli Jews
Footballers from Tel Aviv
Hapoel Nir Ramat HaSharon F.C. players
Maccabi Haifa F.C. players
Hapoel Ironi Kiryat Shmona F.C. players
Israeli Premier League players
Liga Leumit players
Israel international footballers
Association football defenders